Buccino is a town and comune in Campania in Italy, in the province of Salerno, located about 700 m above sea level.

Geography
The municipality borders with Auletta, Colliano, Palomonte, Romagnano al Monte, Salvitelle, San Gregorio Magno and Sicignano degli Alburni. It counts the hamlets (frazioni) of Buccino Scalo, Pianelle, San Giovanni, Teglia, Temponi and Tufariello.

History
In Roman times, the town was known as Volcei. It was the chief town of the independent tribe of the Volceiani, Vulcientes or Volcentani, whose territory was bounded north by that of the Hirpini, west and south by Lucania and east by the territory of Venusia. Some pre-Roman ruins still exist. It became a municipium, and in 323 CE had an extensive territory attached to it, including the town of Numistro, the large Cyclopean walls of which may still be seen, 35 km below Muro Lucano.

Main sights
Below the town is a well-preserved Roman bridge  over the Tanagro river.

References

External links

Cities and towns in Campania
Localities of Cilento